Changwon National University (CWNU) is a public institution of higher education located in Changwon,  Gyeongsangnam-do, South Korea.

History 
 1969. 03. 21. Founded as Masan College of Education.
 1991. 03. 01. Accredited as a university.
 1999. 11. 02. Established the first Graduate School of Labor Studies among national universities.
 1999. 08. 18. Obtained the first ISO 9001 certification for undergraduate administration among universities in South Korea.
 2004. 06. 18. Selected by the New University for Regional Innovation (NURI) Project.
 2005. 10. 05. Granted the Presidential Award at the Korea Regional Innovation Convention & Expo.
 2006. 02. 24. Selected as an excellent university by the Employment Support Reinforcement Program.
 2011. 09. 02. Selected as an Engineering Research Center (ERC) by the Leading Research Center Support Project.
 2017. 04. 18. Selected by the Leaders in Industry-University Cooperation (LINC+) Project.
 2019. 03. 01. Selected by the University Innovation Project.
 2020. 04. 28. Selected for the Smart Manufacturing Human Resource Education Project.

Academics

Graduate Schools of Professional Studies

Korean Language School 
Korean Language School (KLS) is a language school under the Institute of International Affairs and Education at CWNU.

International Programs 
Changwon National University has signed an MOU with universities and agencies throughout Asia, Europe, North America, Oceania and Africa to develop global leaders through diverse international programs such as student exchange and research exchange. As of 2020, the university signed MOUs with 190 universities in around 30 countries including the United States, China, Japan, Germany, France and others. The Institute of International Affairs and Education operates different international exchange programs, including student exchanges and short-term and long-term language courses. Various foreign language courses are available to students and faculty members. Also, the institute operates a video learning classroom, a self-study room, and an English lounge.

 International Summer Camp: Students attending sister universities abroad learn the Korean language and culture with CWNU students for three weeks during summer vacations.
 Exchange Student Program: Exchange students spend one or two regular semesters at a sister university abroad to receive course credits.
 One to One Program: Students are matched with foreign exchange students for language and culture exchange. Upon completion, participants get points for the non-credit mileage program.
 International Students Council (ISC): The ISC, an autonomous student organization, helps international students adapt to campus life. ISC holds a variety of global communication events, including welcoming parties for international students, sports festivals, and cultural experiences with the help of the Institute of International Affairs and Education.
 Study Group for International Students: New international students in the undergraduate course are matched with Korean students of the same major to learn the Korean language or major courses. Upon completion, participants get points for the non-credit mileage program.

See also
List of colleges and universities in South Korea
Education in South Korea

References

External links
 Official school website, in English and Korean
 Campus Map

1969 establishments in South Korea
Buildings and structures in Changwon
Educational institutions established in 1969
National universities and colleges in South Korea
Universities and colleges in South Gyeongsang Province